Pablo Cuesta (born 12 September 1962) is a Cuban water polo player. He competed in the men's tournament at the 1992 Summer Olympics.

References

1962 births
Living people
Cuban male water polo players
Olympic water polo players of Cuba
Water polo players at the 1992 Summer Olympics
Place of birth missing (living people)